The Class of 1952 Stadium is home to Princeton University's women's and men's lacrosse and field hockey teams. The stadium is lighted and fits approximately 4,000.

The stadium was originally dedicated on October 14, 1995.

The field's original astro turf was replaced with a new synthetic turf called FieldTurf in 2012 as part of a renovation that included the naming of the physical field as Sherrerd Field.

The stadium was the home for 34 Ivy League championships and six NCAA championships.

References

College field hockey venues in the United States
College lacrosse venues in the United States
Lacrosse venues in the United States
Princeton University buildings
1995 establishments in New Jersey
Princeton Tigers field hockey
Princeton Tigers lacrosse